Walid Kamal Jumblatt (born 7 August 1949) is a Lebanese Druze politician and former militia commander who has been leading the Progressive Socialist Party since 1977. While leading the Lebanese National Resistance Front and allying with the Amal Movement during the Lebanese Civil War, he worked closely with Suleiman Frangieh to oppose Amine Gemayel's rule as president in 1983. After the civil war, he initially supported Syria but later led an anti-Assad stance during the start of the Syrian Civil War. He is still active in politics, most recently leading his party, the Progressive Socialist Party (PSP) in the 2022 Lebanese general election.

Early life and education
Jumblatt was born in August 1949, the son of the PSP's founder Kamal Jumblatt. He is the maternal grandson of Emir Shakib Arslan. Walid Jumblatt graduated from the American University of Beirut with a bachelor's degree in political science and public administration in 1972.

Career
Upon graduation, Jumblatt worked as a reporter for An Nahar in Beirut. The BBC describes Jumblatt as "leader of Lebanon's most powerful Druze clan and heir to a leftist political dynasty based around the Progressive Socialist Party". Assem Qanso of the Arab Socialist Ba'ath Party of Lebanon accused Jumblatt of abandoning his father's beliefs. On 12 January 1982, he survived a car bomb explosion near his house in Beirut during the Lebanese Civil War. In July 1983, after Amine Gemayel became president, Suleiman Frangieh, Rashid Karami and Walid Jumblatt formed a Syrian-backed National Salvation Front to challenge Gemayel's rule and the pact between Lebanon and Israel that was financially supported by the US. Jumblatt served as minister of public works, transport and tourism in the National Unity cabinet led by then prime minister Rashid Karami, which was formed in May 1984. His main ally during the war was Amal Movement's leader, Nabih Berri.In the 1996 Rafic Hariri cabinet, Walid Jumblatt was appointed Minister for Refugees. He was a supporter of Syria, but following the death of Syrian President Hafez Assad in 2000, he campaigned for Damascus to relinquish control. Jumblatt's close links with the Syrian old guard alienated him from the new presidency of Bashar al-Assad. This pitted him against then president Émile Lahoud and the Lebanese Shiite party Hezbollah of which he said: "Their fighters have done a good job defying and defeating the Israeli army, OK, but the question we ask is where their allegiance goes: to a Lebanese strong central authority or somewhere else?" In the 2009 general elections, Jumblatt won a seat from Shouf as part of the 14 March Alliance list. Following issues with Hezbollah's community, his son Taymour Jumblatt fled to France with his family after multiple death threats which prevented him from joining the local political scene.With the onset of the Syrian civil war, Jumblatt and the PSP moved towards an anti-Assad stance. Jumblatt has been crucial in negotiations regarding the Syrian Druze during the Syrian Civil War, and has stated about al-Nusra Front "I cannot classify, like Western countries, Nusra as terrorist because most of Nusra are Syrians. The regime of Bashar obliged the Syrians to join Nusra". After al-Nusra Front allegedly killed 20 Druze villagers in Qalb Loze on 10 June 2015, Jumblatt responded that "Any inciting rhetoric will not be beneficial, and you should remember that Bashar Assad’s policies pushed Syria into this chaos".

Jumblatt believes that the order to kill his father came from Hafez al-Assad. He said he would rather "commit a political suicide" than reconcile with his son Bashar al-Assad.

In 2014, Jumblatt declared himself in favor of the legalisation of cannabis in Lebanon. In 2015, he admitted hiding the Swedish spy Stig Bergling during the early 1990s in a remote place in Lebanon upon the request of Russian authorities. On 4–7 May 2015, Jumblatt testified at the Special Tribunal for Lebanon related to the investigations of the assassination of Rafic Hariri.

In May 2017, the trial of four men accused of conspiring to assassinate Walid Jumblatt began.

Personal life
At the age of 20, Jumblatt married an Iranian actress, ten years his senior. His father did not endorse the marriage and the two became estranged. In 1981, after a divorce and his father's death, Jumblatt married Gervette, a Jordanian of Circassian descent. Together they had three children: Taymour, Aslan, and Dalia. Later he married Nora al-Sharabati, daughter of Ahmad al-Sharabati. In 2018, his son Taymur Jumblatt replaced him as a candidate for parliamentary elections.

Arts
Like many political leaders, Jumblatt has been the subject of photography since the late 1970s. The photographer Ziad Antar made a portrait of him using an old expired film, which produced a ghostly effect. The image is said to evoke the danger the Lebanese Druze leader faces after he had criticized Hezbollah and the Syrian government.

See also
 Cedar Revolution
 Druze in Lebanon
 Lebanese Civil War
 Lebanese National Movement
 Mountain War (Lebanon)
 People’s Liberation Army (Lebanon)
 Jumblatt family

References

External links

Walid Jumblatt, by Gary C. Gambill and Daniel Nassif, Middle East Intelligence Bulletin, Vol 3, No 5, May 2001
"It's strange for me to say it, but this process of change has started because of the American invasion of Iraq" quoted in Beirut's Berlin Wall, by David Ignatius, Washington Post, 23 February 2005

1949 births
Living people
People from Chouf District
Lebanese Druze
Lebanese people of Iranian descent
Progressive Socialist Party politicians
Members of the Parliament of Lebanon
Warlords
Lebanese democracy activists
Lebanese left-wing activists
Walid
Lebanese politicians of Kurdish descent
American University of Beirut alumni
Tourism ministers of Lebanon